The Florida Police Benevolent Association is a state-wide police union established in 1972, with a reported total membership of over 36,000.

The union is "politically proactive", engaged in labor negotiations, advocacy, legal defense, and political endorsements.  It's organized into regional chapters:  the South Florida PBA, with 6,500 members from over 40 agencies; the Big Bend PBA, with almost 500 members; West Central Florida BPA; the Broward County PBA; and others.  

The FBPA is one of several significant state-wide police unions which are "dominant in all but the largest cities".  Others are in California, Texas, Wisconsin, New York, and New Jersey.

References

See also 

 Police unions in the United States

Police unions in the United States
1972 establishments in Florida
Trade unions in Florida